Jérôme Guedj (born 23 January 1972) is a French politician. He is a member of the Socialist Party and is the member of the sixth constituency of Essonne, President of the General council of Essonne between 2011 and 2014, General Councillor of the Canton of Massy-Est and alderman of Massy.

He lost his seat in the 2017 French legislative election. but won back his seat in the 2022 French legislative election, defeating minister Amélie de Montchalin, as the NUPES candidate.

References

External links
Website

1972 births
Living people
Socialist Party (France) politicians
Sciences Po alumni
École nationale d'administration alumni
People from Pantin
21st-century French politicians
Deputies of the 14th National Assembly of the French Fifth Republic
Deputies of the 16th National Assembly of the French Fifth Republic
Jewish French politicians
Politicians from Île-de-France